David Evans (born 19 August 1988 in Swansea, Wales) is a rugby union player for Neath RFC.
He has been selected for the current Wales national rugby sevens team 2008–09 squad.

External links
 Bio

Neath RFC players
Welsh rugby union players
Rugby union players from Swansea
Living people
1988 births
Ospreys (rugby union) players
Rugby union wings